The following is a list of the MTV Movie Award winners and nominees for Best On-Screen Duo, which were awarded from 1992 to 2006 and from 2013 to 2015. In 2012, it was replaced with Best Cast. In 2016, it was replaced with Ensemble Cast. In 2017, it was replaced with Best On-Screen Team. The award was not presented in 2019. In 2022, it was replaced with Best Team.

Winners and nominees

Best On-Screen Duo

1992–1999

2000–2006, 2013–2015

Best Cast

Best On-Screen Team

Best Team

References 
  

MTV Movie & TV Awards
Entertainer duos